In Concert is a live album by Jethro Tull, recorded on 8 October 1991 at the Hammersmith Odeon in London and released in 1995.

Track listing
 "Minstrel in the Gallery/Cross-Eyed Mary" – 4:00
 "This Is Not Love" – 4:00
 "Rocks on the Road" – 6:30
 "Heavy Horses" – 7:33
 "Tall Thin Girl" – 3:28
 "Still Loving You" – 4:40
 "Thick as a Brick" – 7:48
 "A New Day Yesterday" – 5:45
 "Blues Jam" (Instrumental) – 3:00
 "Jump Start" – 6:30

Personnel
 Ian Anderson – vocals, flute, mandolin, acoustic guitar, harmonica
 Martin Barre – electric guitar, acoustic guitar
 Maartin Allcock – keyboards
 Dave Pegg – bass
 Doane Perry  – drums

References

Jethro Tull (band) live albums
1995 live albums
Albums recorded at the Hammersmith Apollo